Hoseynabad (also Romanized as Ḩoseynābād) is a village in Rumiani Rural District, Suri District, Rumeshkhan County, Lorestan Province, Iran. At the 2006 census, its population was 351, in 73 families.

References 

Populated places in Rumeshkhan County